Pseudoplectania nigrella, commonly known as the ebony cup, the black false plectania, or the hairy black cup, is a species of fungi in the family Sarcosomataceae. The fruit bodies of this saprobic fungus are small blackish cups, typically up to  broad, that grow in groups on soil, often amongst pine needles and short grass near coniferous trees. Pseudoplectania nigrella has a worldwide distribution, and has been found in North America, the Caribbean, Britain, Europe, India, Madagascar, New Zealand, and Japan. The fungus produces a unique chemical compound, plectasin, that has attracted research interest for its ability to inhibit the growth of the common human pathogenic bacterium Streptococcus pneumoniae.

Taxonomy and naming
Christian Hendrik Persoon named the species Peziza nigrella in his Systema Mycologia in 1801, and it was sanctioned under this name in Elias Magnus Fries' Systema Mycologicum in 1821. In 1870, German mycologist Fuckel transferred it to his newly described genus Pseudoplectania, and made it the type species. The species was ulteriorly placed in Crouania by Friedrich August Hazslinszky von Hazslin, and in Plectania by Petter Karsten (1885), but neither placement is considered correct.

The fungus is commonly known as the "ebony cup", the "black false plectania", or the "hairy black cup".

Description
The fruit bodies (technically called apothecia) typically grow in groups, or sometimes crowded closely together, with small stems or missing them entirely. Initially, the fruit bodies are closed and roughly spherical, but as they develop they expand to become cup-shaped, or almost flat. The inner surface of the cups bear the reproductive spore-bearing layer, or hymenium; it is brownish-black, with an edge that is often wavy and curved slightly inwards, and covered with fine hairs. The hairs are long but usually closely coiled and twisted, which gives  to the exterior of the cup a slightly tomentose appearance of nearly uniform thickness throughout their entire length. They are pale brown and 4–6 µm in diameter.

The asci are roughly cylindrical with a long stem-like base; the entire ascus is often as long as 300–325 µm and about 15 µm in diameter at the thickest point. The spores are round, smooth, translucent (hyaline), and have diameters of about 12–14 µm. They are filled with many small oil droplets. The paraphyses (sterile filamentous hyphae in the hymenium) are enlarged at their tips and filled with brown colored matter, about 4 µm thick.

Similar species
Pseudoplectania sphagnophila resembles P. nigrella, but has a more deeply and persistently cup-shaped fruit body, a short but distinct stem, and only grows amongst sphagnum moss. Plectania melastoma has elliptical to spindle-shaped spores measuring 20–28 by 8–12 µm, while P. milleri has elliptical spores, and the margin of its cups have star-shaped points.

Edibility
Pseudoplectania nigrella is considered inedible. It has no distinctive taste or odor.

Habitat and distribution

This species is saprobic, and is found growing in groups on the ground or on moss-covered decaying wood, especially amongst fallen pine needles. In North America, fruit bodies appear in the spring and summer, and are fairly common; in Britain, the fungus fruits from winter to spring, and is rare. Its small size and dark color makes it easy to overlook.

Pseudoplectania nigrella has a worldwide distribution, and has been found in North America, the Caribbean, Europe, India, Madagascar, New Zealand, Israel, and Japan.

Bioactive compounds

Defensins are antibiotics made from peptides and are typically found in animals and higher plants. Plectasin, found in Pseudoplectania nigrella, is the first defensin to be isolated from a fungus. Plectasin has a chemical structure resembling defensins found in spiders, scorpions, dragonflies and mussels. In general, defensins have commonalities in their molecular structure, such as cysteines in the peptide stabilized with disulfide bonds. In particular, defensins from P. nigrella, invertebrates, and plants and share a conformation that has been named the CSαβ motif.  In laboratory tests, plectasin was especially active in inhibiting the growth of the common human pathogen Streptococcus pneumoniae, including strains resistant to conventional antibiotics. Plectasin has a low toxicity in mice, and cured them of peritonitis and pneumonia caused by S. pneumoniae as efficiently as vancomycin and penicillin, suggesting that it may have therapeutic potential. In 2010, Chinese scientists announced a method for high-level production of plectasin using transgenic E. coli.

References

External links

Pezizales
Inedible fungi
Fungi of Europe
Fungi of North America
Fungi of New Zealand
Fungi of Asia
Fungi described in 1801
Taxa named by Christiaan Hendrik Persoon